The United States District Court for the Middle District of North Carolina (in case citations, M.D.N.C.) is a United States district court with jurisdiction over 24 counties in the center of North Carolina.  It consists of five divisions with a headquarters in Greensboro, North Carolina.

Appeals from the Middle District of North Carolina are taken to the United States Court of Appeals for the Fourth Circuit (except for patent claims and claims against the U.S. government under the Tucker Act, which are appealed to the Federal Circuit).

Jurisdiction
The U.S. District Court for the Middle District of North Carolina has jurisdiction over 24 counties: Alamance, Cabarrus, Caswell, Chatham, Davidson, Davie, Durham (excluding that portion of Durham County encompassing the Federal Correctional Institution, Butner, North Carolina), Forsyth, Guilford, Hoke, Lee, Montgomery, Moore, Orange, Person, Randolph, Richmond, Rockingham, Rowan, Scotland, Stanly, Stokes, Surry, and Yadkin.

The district's jurisdiction was modified in 2021 to transfer the portions of four counties (Hoke, Moore, Richmond, and Scotland) containing Fort Bragg Military Reservation and Camp Mackall to the Eastern District of North Carolina.

History
The United States District Court for the District of North Carolina was established on June 4, 1790, by 1 Stat. 126. On June 9, 1794 it was subdivided into three districts by 1 Stat. 395, but on March 3, 1797, the three districts were abolished and the single District restored by 1 Stat. 517, until April 29, 1802, when the state was again subdivided into three different districts by 2 Stat. 156.

In both instances, these districts, unlike those with geographic designations that existed in other states, were titled by the names of the cities in which the courts sat. After the first division, they were styled the District of Edenton, the District of New Bern, and the District of Wilmington; after the second division, they were styled the District of Albemarle, the District of Cape Fear, and the District of Pamptico. However, in both instances, only one judge was authorized to serve all three districts, causing them to effectively operate as a single district. The latter combination was occasionally referred to by the cumbersome title of the United States District Court for the Albemarle, Cape Fear & Pamptico Districts of North Carolina.

On June 4, 1872, North Carolina was re-divided into two Districts, Eastern and Western, by 17 Stat. 215. The Middle District was created from portions of the Eastern and Western Districts on March 2, 1927, by 44 Stat. 1339. Shortly thereafter, President Calvin Coolidge appointed Johnson Jay Hayes by recess appointment to be the first judge of the Middle District of North Carolina.

Current judges
:

Former judges

Chief judges

Succession of seats

U.S. Attorneys for the Middle District
Frank A. Linney (1927–1928)
Edwin L. Gavin (1928–1932)
John R. McCrary (1932–1934)
Carlisle W. Higgins (1934–1947)
Bryce R. Holt (1947–1954)
Edwin M. Stanley (1954–1957)
Robert L. Gavin (1957–1958)
James E. Holshouser, Sr. (1958–1961)
Lafayette Williams (1961)
William H. Murdock (1961–1969)
William Lindsay Osteen Sr. (1969–1974)
N. Carlton Tilley Jr. (1974–1977)
Benjamin H. White, Jr. (1977)
Mickey Michaux (1977–1980)
Kenneth W. McAllister (1981–1986)
Robert H. Edmunds Jr. (1986–1993)
Benjamin H. White, Jr. (1993)
Walter C. Holton Jr. (1994–2001)
Anna Mills Wagoner (2001–2010)
Ripley Rand (2010–2017)
Sandra J. Hairston (2017–2018)
Matthew G.T. Martin (2018–2021)
Sandra J. Hairston (2021–present)

See also
 Courts of North Carolina
 List of current United States district judges
 List of United States federal courthouses in North Carolina
 United States District Court for the Eastern District of North Carolina
 United States District Court for the Western District of North Carolina
 Salisbury District, historic legislative district

References

External links
 United States District Court for the Middle District of North Carolina

North Carolina, Middle
North Carolina law
Durham, North Carolina
Greensboro, North Carolina
Richmond County, North Carolina
Rowan County, North Carolina
Winston-Salem, North Carolina
1927 establishments in North Carolina
Courthouses in North Carolina
Courts and tribunals established in 1927